The 1951 Isle of Man Tourist Trophy

Senior Results

Junior TT Results

Lightweight Results

Ultra Lightweight Results

Clubmans Senior Results

Clubmans Junior Results

External links
Detailed race results
Isle of Man TT winners

Isle of Man Tt
Tourist Trophy
Isle of Man TT
Isle of Man TT